Grandview High School is the third-largest high school in the Cherry Creek School District. Grandview opened in 1998 as the district's fifth high school, built to accommodate a population boom in the district's growing southeastern region. Grandview is located in Aurora, Colorado and uses the wolf as its mascot, sporting the colors of blue, black, and white.

Academics

Like many other schools in the Cherry Creek School District, offers and has had success in their Advanced Placement Program, but Grandview does not have an IB program. Grandview also has a variety of Honors classes. The only AP course offered to incoming freshmen is AP Human Geography, and an essay and teacher recommendation is required.

Students have the option to participate in a home-stay in China every four years. There is a Chinese Club and National Chinese Honor Society. Spanish has a variety of teachers to accommodate the large number of students who choose to study it. There is a Spanish Club and National Spanish Honor Society. French studies are also popular, with multiple teachers available. There is a French Club and National French Honor Society. Grandview also offers German language classes. There is a home-stay trip to Germany every other year. German students also do a home-stay with Grandview students in America. Classes are also offered in American Sign Language.

Advanced Placement 

Grandview High School had the most students participating in AP courses in the state of Colorado for the 2014–2015 school year. 59% of the student body took AP exams that year and 88% of those students passed. Grandview's AP success has been recognized with five John Irwin School of Excellence Awards given to Grandview from 2004 to 2009.

Athletics
Grandview offers most standard varsity sports, and has achieved notable success with its football, soccer, cheer, volleyball and cheerleading teams. Grandview's volleyball team has a notable record with state championships in 2004, 2005, 2007, 2013, and 2014. The program has held high success largely in part to Coach Patty Childress.

Grandview also shares Legacy Stadium with Cherokee Trail and Eaglecrest as its home field. The stadium retains artificial grass for its field that is used by several varsity sports such as soccer, football, and lacrosse.

In 2008, Sports Illustrated rated Grandview High School as having the best athletic program in the state of Colorado.

Notable alumni
Evan Baylis, NFL tight end
Greg Bird, MLB first baseman
Kevin Gausman, MLB pitcher for the Toronto Blue Jays
Tanner Gentry, NFL wide receiver
Joe Klopfenstein, football player
Mike Pennel, NFL defensive tackle
Ryan Walters, head football coach at Purdue University
Eddie Yarbrough, NFL defensive end
Nicholas Novodvorskiy, University of Colorado Boulder Division 1 Hockey

References

External links
 

Public high schools in Colorado
Educational institutions established in 1998
Schools in Arapahoe County, Colorado
Cherry Creek School District
School buildings completed in 1998
1998 establishments in Colorado
Education in Aurora, Colorado